Geodia is a genus of sea sponge belonging to the family Geodiidae. It is the type genus of its taxonomic family.

This genus is characterized by a high density of siliceous spicules. Members of this genus are known to be eaten by hawksbill turtles.

Species

 Geodia acanthylastra Lendenfeld, 1910
 Geodia agassizi Lendenfeld, 1910
 Geodia alba (Kieschnick, 1896)
 Geodia amadaiba Tanita & Hoshino, 1989
 Geodia amphistrongyla Lendenfeld, 1910
 Geodia anceps (Vosmaer, 1894)
 Geodia angulata (Lendenfeld, 1910)
 Geodia apiarium (Schmidt, 1870)
 Geodia arabica Carter, 1869
 Geodia areolata Carter, 1880
 Geodia arma Lehnert & Stone, 2019
 Geodia arripiens Lindgren, 1897
 †Geodia asteroderma Hughes, 1985
 Geodia ataxastra Lendenfeld, 1910
 Geodia atlantica (Stephens, 1915)
 Geodia auroristella Dendy, 1916
 Geodia australis Da Silva & Mothes, 2000
 Geodia barretti Bowerbank, 1858
 Geodia basilea Lévi, 1964
 Geodia berryi (Sollas, 1888)
 Geodia bicolor (Lendenfeld, 1910)
 Geodia boesraugi Van Soest & Hooper, 2020
 Geodia breviana Lendenfeld, 1910
 Geodia californica (Lendenfeld, 1910)
 Geodia campbellensis Sim-Smith & Kelly, 2015
 Geodia canaliculata Schmidt, 1868
 Geodia carcinophila (Lendenfeld, 1897)
 Geodia carolae (Lendenfeld, 1910)
 Geodia carteri Sollas, 1888
 Geodia chathamensis Sim-Smith & Kelly, 2015
 Geodia cidaris (Lamarck, 1815)
 Geodia composita Bösraug, 1913
 Geodia conchilega Schmidt, 1862
 Geodia contorta (Bowerbank, 1873)
 Geodia cooksoni (Sollas, 1888)
 Geodia copiosa Sim-Smith & Kelly, 2015
 Geodia corticostylifera Hajdu, Muricy, Custodio, Russo & Peixinho, 1992
 Geodia cribrata Rützler, Piantoni, van Soest & Díaz, 2014
 Geodia crustosa Bösraug, 1913
 Geodia cumulus Schmidt, 1870
 Geodia curacaoensis Van Soest, Meesters & Becking, 2014
 Geodia cydonium (Linnaeus, 1767)
 Geodia cylindrica Thiele, 1898
 Geodia dendyi Burton, 1926
 Geodia depressa Bowerbank, 1873
 Geodia distincta Lindgren, 1897
 Geodia dura (Tendal, 1969)
 Geodia dysoni Bowerbank, 1873
 Geodia echinastrella Topsent, 1904
 Geodia eosaster (Sollas, 1888)
 Geodia erinacea (Lendenfeld, 1888)
 Geodia ewok Sim-Smith & Kelly, 2015
 Geodia exigua Thiele, 1898
 Geodia flemingi Bowerbank, 1873
 Geodia gallica (Lendenfeld, 1907)
 Geodia garoupa Carvalho, Lopes, Cosme & Hajdu, 2016
 Geodia geodina (Schmidt, 1868)
 Geodia gibberella de Laubenfels, 1951
 Geodia gibberosa Lamarck, 1815
 Geodia glariosa (Sollas, 1886)
 Geodia globosa (Baer, 1906)
 Geodia globostellifera Carter, 1880
 Geodia globus Schmidt, 1870
 Geodia harpago Sim-Smith & Kelly, 2015
 Geodia hentscheli Cárdenas, Rapp, Schander & Tendal, 2010
 Geodia hilgendorfi Thiele, 1898
 Geodia hirsuta (Sollas, 1886)
 Geodia hyotania (Tanita, 1965)
 Geodia imperfecta Bowerbank, 1874
 Geodia inaequalis Bowerbank, 1873
 Geodia inconspicua (Bowerbank, 1873)
 Geodia isabella (Dickinson, 1945)
 Geodia japonica Sollas, 1888
 Geodia jousseaumei (Topsent, 1906)
 Geodia kermadecensis Sim-Smith & Kelly, 2015
 Geodia kuekenthali Thiele, 1900
 Geodia labyrinthica (Kirkpatrick, 1903)
 Geodia lacunata (Lamarck, 1815)
 Geodia lebwohli Van Soest & Hooper, 2020
 Geodia leosimi Sim-Smith & Kelly, 2015
 Geodia libera Stephens, 1915
 Geodia lindgreni (Lendenfeld, 1903)
 Geodia littoralis Stephens, 1915
 Geodia lophotriaena Lendenfeld, 1910
 Geodia macandrewii Bowerbank, 1858
 Geodia magellani (Sollas, 1886)
 Geodia margarita Sim-Smith & Kelly, 2015
 Geodia media Bowerbank, 1873
 Geodia megaster Burton, 1926
 Geodia megastrella Carter, 1876
 Geodia mesotriaena Lendenfeld, 1910
 Geodia mesotriaenella Lendenfeld, 1910
 Geodia micraster (Lendenfeld, 1907)
 Geodia micropora Lendenfeld, 1910
 Geodia micropunctata Row, 1911
 Geodia microspinosa (Wilson, 1925)
 Geodia neptuni (Sollas, 1886)
 Geodia nigra Lendenfeld, 1888
 Geodia nilslindgreni Van Soest & Hooper, 2020
 Geodia nitida (Sollas, 1886)
 Geodia nodastrella Carter, 1876
 Geodia nodosa (Sim-Smith & Kelly, 2015)
 Geodia obscura (Thiele, 1898)
 Geodia orthomesotriaena Lebwohl, 1914
 Geodia ostracomorpha (Lévi & Lévi, 1989)
 Geodia ovifractus Burton, 1926
 Geodia ovis Lendenfeld, 1910
 Geodia oxyastra (Lendenfeld, 1910)
 Geodia pachydermata (Sollas, 1886)
 Geodia papyracea Hechtel, 1965
 Geodia parasitica Bowerbank, 1873
 Geodia parva Hansen, 1885
 Geodia paupera Bowerbank, 1873
 Geodia perarmata Bowerbank, 1873
 Geodia pergamentacea Schmidt, 1870
 Geodia peruncinata Dendy, 1905
 Geodia philippinensis Wilson, 1925
 Geodia phlegraei (Sollas, 1880)
 Geodia picteti (Topsent, 1897)
 Geodia placenta Schmidt, 1862
 Geodia pleiades (Sollas, 1888)
 Geodia pocillum Van Soest, 2017
 Geodia poculata Bösraug, 1913
 Geodia praelonga Sim-Smith & Kelly, 2015
 Geodia punctata Hentschel, 1909
 Geodia ramodigitata Carter, 1880
 Geodia ramosa (Topsent, 1928)
 Geodia regina Dendy, 1924
 Geodia reniformis Thiele, 1898
 Geodia reticulata Bowerbank, 1874
 Geodia rex Dendy, 1924
 Geodia riograndensis Silva & Mothes, 2000
 Geodia robusta Lendenfeld, 1907
 Geodia rovinjensis Müller et al., 1983
 Geodia sadiemillsae Sim-Smith & Kelly, 2015
 Geodia sagitta Sim-Smith & Kelly, 2015
 Geodia senegalensis Topsent, 1891
 Geodia sollasi (Lendenfeld, 1888)
 Geodia sparsa Wilson, 1925
 Geodia sphaeroides (Kieschnick, 1896)
 Geodia sphaerulifer (Vacelet & Vasseur, 1965)
 Geodia spheranthastra Pulitzer-Finali, 1993
 Geodia spherastrea Lévi, 1964
 Geodia spherastrella Topsent, 1904
 Geodia spherastrosa (Wilson, 1925)
 Geodia splendida Silva & Mothes, 2000
 Geodia starki Lehnert, Stone & Drumm, 2014
 Geodia stellata Lendenfeld, 1907
 Geodia stellosa (Czerniavsky, 1880)
 Geodia stromatodes (Uliczka, 1929)
 Geodia sulcata Van Soest, 2017
 Geodia tenera Sim-Smith & Kelly, 2015
 Geodia thomsonii Schmidt, 1870
 Geodia tuberculosa Bowerbank, 1872
 Geodia tuberosa Schmidt, 1862
 Geodia tumulosa Bowerbank, 1872
 Geodia tylastra Boury-Esnault, 1973
 Geodia ulleungensis Sim & Kang, 2004
 Geodia vadi Sim-Smith & Kelly, 2015
 Geodia variospiculosa Thiele, 1898
 Geodia vaubani Lévi & Lévi, 1983
 Geodia vestigifera (Dendy, 1924)
 Geodia vosmaeri (Sollas, 1886)
 Geodia williami Sim-Smith & Kelly, 2015

External links

References

Tetractinellida
Extant Campanian first appearances
Taxa named by Jean-Baptiste Lamarck
Sponge genera